Martin Julius Bram (September 25, 1897 - February 9, 1956) was an American prelate of the Episcopal Church, who served as Suffragan Bishop of South Florida from 1951 till 1956.

Early life and education
Bram was born in New York City on September 25, 1897, the son of Martin Samuel Bram and Ellen Chambers. He was educated at the New York City public schools. He studied at Hobart College and graduated with a Bachelor of Arts magna cum laude in 1926. He then enrolled at the Virginia Theological Seminary and earned his Bachelor of Divinity in 1929. He was awarded a Doctor of Divinity by the University of the South.

Ordained ministry
Bram was ordained deacon in June 1928 and priest in November 1929 by Bishop Philip Cook of Delaware. He then became rector of St Paul's Church in Georgetown, Delaware, while in 1933, he became rector of the Church of the Holy Cross in Sanford, Florida. While there, he married Mabel Harris Bowler on June 17, 1935. Between 1941 and 1945, he served as rector of St Andrew's Church in Tampa, Florida, while between 1945 and 1951, he was rector of Holy Trinity Church in West Palm Beach, Florida. In 1950, he was appointed the secretary of the Florida Council of Churches.

Suffragan Bishop of South Florida
On April 10, 1951, Bram was elected on the second ballot, as the Suffragan Bishop of South Florida, during a diocesan convention held in Daytona Beach, Florida. He was consecrated on September 21, 1951, by Henry I. Louttit Sr. of South Florida. He was also active in civil and welfare work. Bram died of a heart attack while attending a retreat at the Good Shepherd Monastery in Orange City, Florida, on February 9, 1956.

References

1897 births
1956 deaths
Hobart and William Smith Colleges alumni
Virginia Theological Seminary alumni
Clergy from New York City
20th-century American Episcopalians
Episcopal bishops of South Florida
20th-century American clergy